Pre-B-cell leukemia homeobox (PBX) refers to a family of transcription factors.

Types include:
 PBX1
 PBX2
 PBX3
 PBX4

See also
 Pre-B cell

References

Transcription factors